Roderick Fitzgerald Gavin (born 20 May 1949 in Paeroa) is a New Zealand sprint canoeist who competed in the late 1970s. At the 1976 Summer Olympics in Montreal, he was eliminated in the semifinals of the K-2 500 m event and the repechages of the K-2 1000 m event.

References
Sports-reference.com profile

1949 births
Canoeists at the 1976 Summer Olympics
Living people
New Zealand male canoeists
Olympic canoeists of New Zealand